David Hannan is a  Australian cinematographer, specializing in underwater cinematography. Hannan's footage has been featured in numerous films, including Sylvia Earle's Mission Blue, Louie Psihoyos' Racing Extinction, and Rob Stewart's Sharkwater and Revolution.

References

 https://www.abc.net.au/news/2013-06-06/an-marine-film-david-hannan/4738528
 https://www.byron-bay.com/blog/137/world-premiere-of-david-hannan%E2%80%99s-new-film-coral-sea-dreaming-in-hd-at-uf09/

External links
Official website

Emmy Award winners
Australian cinematographers
Year of birth missing (living people)
Living people